Alessia Mesiano (born 7 December 1991) is an Italian amateur boxer, 2016 AIBA world champion in the 57 kg.

Alessia Meisano is an athlete of Fiamme Oro.

References

External links 
 Boxe, il mondiale è donna: medaglia d'oro per la Mesiano
 Alessia Mesiano campionessa del mondo nella categoria 57 kg

1991 births
Italian women boxers
Living people
European Games competitors for Italy
Boxers at the 2019 European Games
Boxers of Fiamme Oro
Featherweight boxers
AIBA Women's World Boxing Championships medalists
21st-century Italian women